Hugh Phillips was a Consultant Trauma and Orthopaedic Surgeon to the Norfolk and Norwich Hospital. His special surgical interests were in hip and knee reconstruction, following on from Kenneth McKee. He received his Fellowship of the Royal College of Surgeons of England in 1970 and succeeded Professor Sir Peter Morris as the President on 8 July 2004.

Hugh Phillips who lived in Ashwellthorpe was appointed Deputy Lieutenant of Norfolk in 1996.

Notes

References

External links 
 Biography in Plarr's Lives of the Fellows Online

1940 births
2005 deaths
Fellows of the Royal College of Surgeons
Deputy Lieutenants of Norfolk
People educated at the John Roan School
People from Blackheath, London
People from Ashwellthorpe and Fundenhall